The East Carolina Pirates men's soccer team represented East Carolina University in all NCAA Division I men's college soccer competitions from 1965 until 2005, when the program disbanded due to lack of success. The team beat several top 25 opponents however only had a couple winning seasons in their existence.

References

External links 
 Men's Soccer

 
1961 establishments in North Carolina
2005 disestablishments in North Carolina
Association football clubs established in 1965
Association football clubs disestablished in 2005
Defunct soccer clubs in North Carolina